The 1992 Volvo San Francisco was a men's  tennis tournament played on indoor hard courts at the San Francisco Civic Auditorium in San Francisco, California in the United States and was part of the World Series of the 1992 ATP Tour. It was the 104th edition of the tournament and was held from February 3 through February 9, 1992.  Second-seeded Michael Chang won the singles title and earned $33,800 first-prize money. With the points that first-seeded runner-up Jim Courier earned at the tournament he became the new No. 1 ranked player in the world when the Association of Tennis Professionals (ATP) published their rankings on February 10, 1992.

Finals

Singles

 Michael Chang defeated  Jim Courier 6–3, 6–3
 It was Chang's 1st singles title of the year and the 6th of his career.

Doubles

 Jim Grabb /  Richey Reneberg defeated  Pieter Aldrich /  Danie Visser 6–4, 7–5

References